Zheng Saisai was the defending champion, but lost in the quarterfinals to Ajla Tomljanović.

Karolína Plíšková won the title, defeating Petra Martić in the final, 6–3, 6–2.

Seeds
The top four seeds received a bye into the second round.

Draw

Finals

Top half

Bottom half

Qualifying

Seeds

Qualifiers

Draw

First qualifier

Second qualifier

Third qualifier

Fourth qualifier

References

External links
Main Draw
Qualifying Draw

2019 WTA Tour